The 1917 Copa Aldao was the final match to decide the winner of the Copa Aldao, the 3rd. edition of the international competition organised by the Argentine and Uruguayan Associations together. The final was contested by Argentine Racing Club de Avellaneda and Uruguayan Club Nacional de Football.

The final was held in Parque Pereyra in Montevideo on April 19, 1918. As the match ended 1–1, a playoff was scheduled for July 9 at Gimnasia y Esgrima in Buenos Aires to determine a champion. In that match, Racing beat Nacional 2–1 taking revenge from the previous edition and achieving its first Copa Aldao trophy.

Qualified teams

Venues

Match details

Final

Playoff

References

1918 in Argentine football
1918 in Uruguayan football
a
a
Football in Buenos Aires
Football in Montevideo